Hsien Chung (or Hsien-Chung or Hsien-chung) Wang ( 王宪钟 Wang Xian Zhong; 18 April 1918 in Beijing – 25 June 1978 in New York City) was a Chinese-American mathematician, specializing in differential geometry, Lie groups, and algebraic topology.

Biography
Part of a family, from Shandong Province, that had produced distinguished scholars for several generations, Hsien Chung Wang studied in Tianjin at Nankai High School, where he had an outstanding academic record. In 1936 he matriculated at Tsing Hua University in Beijing.

After completing his Ph.D., Wang went to the United States.

He was an Invited Speaker at the ICM in 1958 in Edinburgh. He was a Guggenheim Fellow for the academic year 1960–1961. The Wang sequence used in algebraic topology is named in his honor.

He married in 1956 and was the father of three daughters. His doctoral students include J. Stephen Halperin.

Selected publications
with S. S. Chern: "Differential geometry in symplectic space." I, Sci. Rep. Nat. Tsing Hua Univ 4 (1947): 453–477.
"Axiom of the plane in a general space of paths." Annals of Mathematics (1948): 731–737. 
"The homology groups of the fibre-bundles over a sphere." Duke Math. J 16 (1949): 33–38.
"Homogeneous spaces with non-vanishing Euler characteristics." Annals of Mathematics (1949): 925–953. 
"A problem of PA Smith." Proceedings of the American Mathematical Society 1, no. 1 (1950): 18–19. 
"A remark on transformation groups leaving fixed an end point." Proceedings of the American Mathematical Society 3, no. 4 (1952): 548–549. 
 "One-dimensional cohomology group of locally compact metrically homogeneous space." Duke Mathematical Journal 19, no. 2 (1952): 303–310. 
"Complex parallisable manifolds." Proceedings of the American Mathematical Society 5, no. 5 (1954): 771–776. 
with Kentaro Yano: "A class of affinely connected spaces." Transactions of the American Mathematical Society 80, no. 1 (1955): 72–92. 
"Discrete subgroups of solvable Lie groups I." Annals of Mathematics (1956): 1–19. 
with William M. Boothby: "On contact manifolds." Annals of Mathematics (1958): 721–734. 
"Compact transformation groups of Sn with an (n–1)-dimensional orbit." American Journal of Mathematics 82, no. 4 (1960): 698–748. 
with Samuel Pasiencier: "Commutators in a semi-simple Lie group." Proceedings of the American Mathematical Society 13, no. 6 (1962): 907–913. 
"On the deformations of lattice in a Lie group." American Journal of Mathematics 85, no. 2 (1963): 189–212. 
with W. M. Boothby and Shoshichi Kobayashi: "A note on mappings and automorphisms of almost complex manifolds." Annals of Mathematics (1963): 329–334. 
"A remark on co-compactness of transformation groups." American Journal of Mathematics 95, no. 4 (1973): 885–903.

References

1918 births
1978 deaths
20th-century American mathematicians
Mathematicians from Beijing
Chinese emigrants to the United States
Differential geometers
Cornell University faculty
Institute for Advanced Study visiting scholars
Educators from Beijing
Chinese science writers
Writers from Beijing